Sandy Smolan is an American feature film, television, and documentary film director.

Early career

His critically acclaimed debut feature film Rachel River was nominated for the Grand Jury Prize at the Sundance Film Festival and took awards for Best Cinematography and a Special Jury Prize for actress Viveca Lindfors.

Smolan began his career directing documentaries. He directed The Maghreb Journals, when he was 20, shot over five months in Algeria, Tunisia and Morocco. He worked with Morley Safer and Charles Kuralt on two specials for CBS News and worked with Jim Brown on the feature release of The Weavers: Wasn't That A Time. He produced numerous programs for PBS, including several award-winning shorts, several of the Day In The Life series of documentaries and the political themed Sanctuary.
 
He was nominated for Best Director for the Emmy Award-winning Taking A Stand for ABC with Betty Buckley. His television movies include The Last Soldier for HBO, the mini-series Beach Girls with Rob Lowe and Julia Ormond for Lifetime, and A Place To Be for CBS. He directed the acclaimed pilot for the CBS series Middle Ages and had directed over fifty network and cable episodic series, beginning with L.A. Law and continuing with dozens of other prime-time dramas including Northern Exposure, Brooklyn Bridge, Picket Fences, Ally McBeal, The District, Ed, Dawson's Creek, Everwood, Chicago Hope, The OC and Brothers and Sisters.

He is one of the leading directors creating original programming for the web and recently directed the ten-part series In Gayle We Trust for NBC.com and the web series First Day for Alloy Entertainment, winner of a 2010 Advertising Age Media Vanguard Award.

Smolan's documentary 12 Stones, about the transformation of a group of illiterate women in southern Nepal recently won the Jury Prize for Best Short Documentary at the Tallahassee and Newport Beach Film Festivals. He has also produced and directed many other documentaries, including films for The Bill and Melinda Gates foundation, HP, Cisco, Intel and SAP.

His most recent documentary, The Human Face of Big Data, won the Jury Prize for Best Cinematography at The Boston International Film Festival and was selected to be part of the American Film Showcase, the major film diplomacy program of U.S. Department of State.

Smolan was a featured speaker at the 2010 EG Conference in Monterey, California, the 2010 INK Conference in Association with TED, in Lavasa, India, and he was an associate professor at The USC School of Cinematic Arts.

Directing credits
 Descending from Heaven
 The Middleman
 Men in Trees
 Eli Stone
 October Road (2 episodes, 2007-2008)
 Brothers & Sisters (2 episodes, 2007)
 Three Moons Over Milford
 Beach Girls
 Everwood (5 episodes, 2003-2005)
 The Mountain (2 episodes, 2004)
 The O.C. (2 episodes, 2004)
 One Tree Hill
 Miss Match
 Ed
 Diagnosis Murder (2 episodes, 2000-2001)
 The District
 The Huntress
 Dawson's Creek
 Jack & Jill
 Ally
 Now and Again
 Beggars and Choosers (3 episodes, 1999)
 Wasteland (2 episodes, 1999)
 Legacy
 Sins of the City
 Love Boat: The Next Wave
 Ally McBeal (2 episodes, 1997-1998)
 Dellaventura
 Weird Science
 Second Noah
 Dangerous Minds
 Picket Fences
 Earth 2
 Chicago Hope
 A Place to Be Loved
 Class of '96
 Middle Ages
 The Heights
 Northern Exposure (3 episodes, 1990-1991)
 Sisters (2 episodes, 1991)
 Brooklyn Bridge (1991) TV series (unknown episodes)
 Eddie Dodd (1991) TV series (unknown episodes)
 Doogie Howser, M.D. (2 episodes, 1989-1991)
 Equal Justice (1990) TV series (unknown episodes)
 L.A. Law (3 episodes, 1989)
 Life Goes On (1989) TV series (unknown episodes)
 ABC Afterschool Special ("Taking a Stand")
 Vietnam War Story: The Last Days - The Last Soldier
 Rachel River
 A Day in the Life of Hawaii

Personal life
Smolan met Pamela Reed when directing her in Rachel River. They married in 1988 and have two adoptive children, Reed and Lily.

References

External links
 

American television directors
Living people
Place of birth missing (living people)
Year of birth missing (living people)